Indu or INDU may refer to:
 $INDU, a symbol for the Dow Jones Industrial Average
 Chandra, the Hindu moon deity
 South Asians, peoples of the South Asian background in South Asian and West Indian regions. (I.E. Indu-Chinese & Indo-Trini)
A film starring Roja Selvamani
 Indu Film
 Indu chakra, a group of 6 musical scales in Carnatic music
 Indu, a Bengali, kayastha, surname
 the official acronym for the Canadian House of Commons Standing Committee on Industry, Science and Technology